Scott Bennett "Scotty" Jacoby (born November 26, 1956) is an American former actor. He appeared in the 1972 television film That Certain Summer, for which he won an Emmy Award. He is also known for playing the lead role in the made-for-TV film Bad Ronald (1974). He is also known for his recurring role as Dorothy's son, Michael Zbornak, in a few episodes of the 1980s sitcom The Golden Girls.

Early life
Jacoby was born in the Chicago suburb of Skokie, Illinois, and his family moved to Queens in New York City when he was ten years old. At the age of eleven, he was nominated for a Tony Award for his portrayal of Ally in the Broadway musical Golden Rainbow, which starred Steve Lawrence and Eydie Gormé, for the category Best Featured Actor in a Musical at the 22nd Tony Awards, held on April 21, 1968.

Career 
By the early 1970s, an editorial questioned whether Jacoby was "a new Mickey Rooney". He began his television career playing the role of "Hubcap", who was a friend of Josh Hall (Laurence Fishburne) on the ABC daytime soap opera One Life to Live. He also had a recurring role on the 1980s sitcom The Golden Girls as Michael Zbornak, the musician son of Dorothy Zbornak (Bea Arthur). In 2001, Jacoby co-directed Rage: 20 Years of Punk Rock West Coast Style.

Personal life 
Jacoby is the eldest of five acting siblings, including half-brothers Billy Jacoby (now Billy Jayne, born in 1969), Bobby Jacoby (now Robert Jayne, born in 1973), and sisters Laura Jacoby and Susan Jacoby.

Jacoby is of Jewish descent. He is married to Lyn Jacoby and they have two children.

Filmography

Film

Television

References

External links

1956 births
Living people
American male film actors
American male television actors
Male actors from Chicago
American people of Jewish descent
Outstanding Performance by a Supporting Actor in a Drama Series Primetime Emmy Award winners